Zahir Iqbal Alam (10 April 1970 – 30 May  2012) was an Indian first-class cricketer who played for Assam cricket team from 1988 to 1995. He was born in Gauhati, Assam. He was a prolific right-handed batsman. Alam appeared in 22 first class matches, scored 1,398 runs with an average of 36.78 and his highest score was 257. He also scripted a world record second-wicket partnership of 475 runs with former India Test player Lalchand Rajput against Tripura in a Ranji Trophy match in 1990–91.

Alam died in a Bangalore hospital on 30 May 2012 at the age of 42. He was suffering from a liver ailment.

References

External links
 
 

1970 births
Indian cricketers
Assam cricketers
Cricketers from Guwahati
2012 deaths
Deaths from liver disease